Veljkovo is a village in the municipality of Negotin, Serbia. At the 2002 census, the village had a population of 206 people.

References

Populated places in Bor District